Arataca is a municipality in the state of Bahia in the North-East region of Brazil. It consists of two districts: Arataca, the municipal seat, and Itatingui. 

The municipality contains part of the  Serra das Lontras National Park, created in 2010.

See also
List of municipalities in Bahia

References

Municipalities in Bahia